Matías Ariel Sánchez (born 18 August 1987) is an Argentine footballer who play for Brown de Adrogué.

Club career
Sánchez made his way through Racing Club's youth system to make his debut in a 0–3 defeat to Boca Juniors on March 5, 2006. He became a regular in the Racing team, appearing in 15 of the 19 games during the 2006 Apertura tournament.

Sánchez was part of the Estudiantes de La Plata squad that won the 2009 Copa Libertadores.

Following the 2012 Major League Soccer season, Sánchez had been rumored as a target of the Columbus Crew.  On February 8, 2013, Sánchez officially signed with the club. Sanchez was released following one season in Columbus.

On 16 August 2017, Sánchez signed for A-League club Melbourne Victory on a one-year deal. On 15 May 2018, Sánchez was released by Melbourne Victory along with three of his teammates.

International career
In 2007, Sánchez was selected to represent the Argentine under-20 team at the South American Youth Championship held in Paraguay. He was also part of the U-20 squad that won the 2007 FIFA U-20 World Cup in Canada.

Personal life
Sánchez has a wife, a daughter and a son.

Honours

Club
Estudiantes
Copa Libertadores (1): 2009
Argentine Primera División (1): 2010 Apertura

Melbourne Victory
A-League Championship (1): 2017–18

International
Argentina U-20
FIFA U-20 World Cup (1): 2007

References

External links

1987 births
Living people
People from Temperley
Argentine footballers
Argentina under-20 international footballers
Argentine expatriate footballers
Association football midfielders
Racing Club de Avellaneda footballers
Estudiantes de La Plata footballers
Columbus Crew players
Levadiakos F.C. players
Unión de Santa Fe footballers
Club Atlético Temperley footballers
Melbourne Victory FC players
San Martín de San Juan footballers
Gimnasia y Esgrima de Jujuy footballers
Club Atlético Brown footballers
Argentine Primera División players
Major League Soccer players
Super League Greece players
A-League Men players
Primera Nacional players
Argentine expatriate sportspeople in the United States
Argentine expatriate sportspeople in Greece
Expatriate soccer players in the United States
Expatriate footballers in Greece
Sportspeople from Buenos Aires Province